Charaxes velox is a butterfly in the family Nymphalidae. It is found on Socotra, an island in the Arabian Sea.

Description
A full description is given by Walter Rothschild and Karl Jordan, 1900 Novitates Zoologicae volume 7:287-524.  page 368 for terms see volume 5:545-601

Taxonomy
The species is sometimes treated as a subspecies of Charaxes candiope.

Charaxes candiope group. The group members are:

Charaxes candiope
Charaxes antamboulou - like next
Charaxes cowani - like last
Charaxes velox
Charaxes thomasius

References

External links
Images of Charaxes velox at Bold

Taxa named by William Robert Ogilvie-Grant
Butterflies described in 1899
velox
Endemic fauna of Socotra